The Deepings School is a coeducational secondary school and sixth form with academy status, located on Park Road in Deeping St James (near Peterborough) in Lincolnshire, England. , the school is attended by almost 1,500 pupils aged 11 to 18 taught by 90 teaching staff. It includes pupils from Stamford, Spalding, Langtoft, Baston, Bourne and the Deeping area.

Construction
The site was on nine acres, on the main Spalding to Market Deeping road. It had steel and reinforced concrete, faced with Stamfordstone bricks from Williamson Cliff Ltd. Structural steelwork was from Robert Stevenson Structural of Norwich

The classrooms were decorated in soft pastels, so as not to distract, with stronger shades in the circulation areas of corridors and stairways. In the domestic science room were facilities for cooking on gas, electricity and solid fuel. On the ground floor was a general science room, with island benches. The gym was 16ft high, and had 2,800 sq ft, with mahogany herringbone sprung flooring.The assembly hall and dining room were combined, with the kitchens at the back of the hall; it was served around 200 meals a day. The practical handicraft room was joined to the main building with a concrete archway - it taught wood and forge work, metal turning and lathe operating.

History

Secondary modern school
Deepings County Secondary Modern opened on Tuesday 9 September 1958 with 247 pupils. It was opened by Kesteven Education Authority, based in Sleaford. It cost £100,000, and it was hoped to have around 300 boys and girls. The headmaster was Mr E Lamb. It was co-educational, which was Kesteven's policy. It took in those from Market Deeping, West Deeping, Deeping St James, Langtoft, Baston and Greatford.

Comprehensive
It became a comprehensive school from September 1972 with around 450 pupils. The Design Centre started construction in July 1973, to be completed by March 1974 and open by September 1974; it was a two-storey building, with two science laboratories and a staffroom, in preparation for a comprehensive intake.

The headteacher from Easter 1972, 44-year-old John Sweet, lived in Uffington; he had taken over from Jack Lamb, and had been the deputy headteacher since 1964; John Sweet was previously head of English at a school in Devon, and was from South Wales. John Sweet died on 2 October 1974 in a car accident.

Academy
The school converted to academy status on 1 February 2012.

In 2022, the school made national headlines for sending into isolation 50 children for minor violations of its uniform policy, such as wearing the wrong kind of black socks. The headteacher, evangelical Christian

Buildings
Admissions rose to 360, with the addition of a rural science block, built away from the main building, to teach soil study and vegetable growing, and greenhouse cultivation.

In 1990 a new library and sixth form centre was built, opened in 1991.  A language and mathematics block was built in 1997, and a drama studio in 1998.

In 2005 a Business and Enterprise block was built. A new staff room was built, and in 2011 a new school reception, sixth form facilities, and conference centre were completed. A new sixth form block was completed in 2013.

In 2015 a new science centre was built after the original science classrooms were knocked down.

Reports
The 2010 Ofsted report for the 2009 inspection rated the school as grade 1 "outstanding" overall. In 2013 the school also achieved grade 1 "outstanding" from Ofsted.

Staff
In 2011 school head teacher Chris Beckett became one of 100 UK teachers selected by the National College for Schools Leadership as a National Leader of Education.

Curriculum
School teaching provision is in line with National Curriculum, and includes the humanities, sciences, mathematics, English language and literature, technology, communications and foreign languages. Subjects can be taken towards GCSE and A-level examinations.

Notable alumni

 Jade Etherington, Paralympian downhill skier
 Jonathan Foyle, architectural broadcaster
 Johnathan Hoggard, BRDC British Formula 3 driver
 Julie Hollman, heptathlete
 Jake Jarman, gymnast
 Ben Wright, footballer

References

External links
 
 Meningitis outbreak in March 1987

Educational institutions established in 1957
Secondary schools in Lincolnshire
The Deepings
1957 establishments in England
Academies in Lincolnshire